The Wesley West House is a historic building located in Mount Vernon, Iowa, United States. West and his wife Polly settled here in 1859. He had local builders Marsden Keyes and Charles H. Davis build this two-story, brick, Italianate residence on his  farm in 1877. After Wesley West died in 1894, his son David acquired the house and did an extensive renovation in 1897. The house remained in the family until 1982. It features a square plan with a single story off-centered kitchen wing, a symmetrical facade, and a hipped roof with bracketed eaves.  The house was listed on the National Register of Historic Places in 1985.

References

Houses completed in 1877
Italianate architecture in Iowa
Houses in Mount Vernon, Iowa
National Register of Historic Places in Linn County, Iowa
Houses on the National Register of Historic Places in Iowa
1877 establishments in Iowa